Copelatus carayoni is a species of diving beetle. It is part of the genus Copelatus in the subfamily Copelatinae of the family Dytiscidae. It was described by Legros in 1949.

References

carayoni
Beetles described in 1949